Commemorative and jubilee coins are issued by the Central Bank of the Republic of Azerbaijan from precious and base metals. The first coin was dedicated to the 500th anniversary of the life and work of Muhammad Fizuli in 1996.

Due to the lack of a mint in the country, all coins have been minted in the countries such as UK, Ukraine, Austria and Poland.

Commemorative Coins Dedicated to the Famous Historical Figures 
In the following table, the commemorative coins were dedicated to anniversaries of life and activities of famous historical figures of Azerbaijan. The coins are worth of 50, 100 and 500 AZN.

Commemorative Coins, New Gepiks 
In 2006, Azerbaijani Government signed a contract with the Austrian Mint one of world's coin produces to design a set of gold coins related with the denomination process. According to the agreement, 50 special gold commemorative sets were prepared in 2005. Coins of denomination of 1, 3, 5, 10, 20 and 50 gepiks were struck at Austrian Mint.

Coins dedicated to "European Games 2015" 
The commemorative coins mentioned below has been dedicated to First European Games that took place in 2015, in Baku.

References 

Coins of Azerbaijan
Azerbaijan
Azerbaijan history-related lists